Baqeriyeh-ye Bala (also Romanized as Bāqerīyeh-ye Bālā; also known as Bāgerīyeh, Bāqerīyeh, Haidārābād, and Ḩeydarābād) is a village in Borj-e Akram Rural District, in the Central District of Fahraj County, Kerman Province, Iran. At the 2006 census, its population was 493, in 122 families.

References 

Populated places in Fahraj County